The Peep Hen 14 is an American trailerable sailboat that was designed by Reuben Trane as a cruiser and first built in 1981.

Production
The design was built by Nimble Boats Works, Sovereign Yachts and the Florida Bay Boat Company between 1981 and 2003 in the United States, but it is now out of production.

Design
The Peep Hen 14 is a recreational sailboat, built predominantly of fiberglass, with wood trim. It is a gaff rigged catboat. The hull has a plumb stem, a vertical transom, a transom-hung rudder controlled by a tiller and a retractable centerboard. It displaces  and carries  of ballast.

The boat is normally fitted with a small  outboard motor for docking and maneuvering.

The design has sleeping accommodation for two people in port and starboard berths that extend under the cockpit seats. The optional portable-type head is located in the cockpit when sleeping.

Operational history
In a 2010 review Steve Henkel wrote, "designer Trane says he conceived this boat 'after a good New Year's Eve party' as a small, beachable, easy-to-use microcruiser. The 'Peep' has the smallest LOD in this book, though she's far from smallest in usable space, In fact, her big freeboard and beam give her second-best space versus the comp[etitor]s ... Best features: Very shallow draft with centerboard up is good for exploring shoal waters. She's easily trailerable (approximate towing weight 1,100 pounds), and short enough to fit into a standard sized garage. Self-bailing cockpit is deep and comfortable. She has a relatively spacious interior for her size—though 14 feet is about the absolute minimum for living aboard, even for a weekend and in protected waters. Boom gallows is a handy feature, as is an optional bimini and cockpit enclosure that zips to the bimini, Worst features: Price new was high, headroom low compared to comps. Tanbark sails and a high, boxy hull with a wide sheer stripe may make her look cute, but few would call her graceful."

See also
List of sailing boat types

Related development
Bay Hen 21
Marsh Hen

References

External links
Photo of a Peep Hen 14

1980s sailboat type designs
Sailing yachts
Trailer sailers
Sailboat type designs by Reuben Trane
Sailboat types built by the Florida Bay Boat Company
Sailboat types built by Sovereign Yachts
Sailboat types built by Nimble Boats